Saint Petersburg State University of Service and Economics (Russian: Санкт-Петербургский государственный университет сервиса и экономики) was a university in Russia, located in Saint Petersburg. It was recently merged with  Saint Petersburg State University of Engineering and Economics and  Saint Petersburg State University of Economics and Finance to create Saint Petersburg State University of Economics.
The University prepares economists, managers of productions, specialists in the financial area, bookkeeping calculation and Audit, information- analysts, specialists in service, engineers for the care of motor transport, complex household equipment, designers of clothing, artists of decorative skill and specialists in the region of socio-cultural service and tourism, of social workers, public relations specialists, journalists, sociologists, jurists, specialists of the trade and restaurant business for the enterprises of the small and mid-sized business, whose weight steadily grows in the economy and the national income of the country.

History 
The history of St. Petersburg State University of Service and Economics starts from the Leningrad branch of Moscow Technological Institute of domestic service, which was open on 16 September 1969. That branch was created as an institute of part-time form of training.

In the beginning there were only four specialties of training. But requirements of the population in domestic service weren’t satisfied enough, and the mission of the institute was to prepare the sufficient supply of highly qualified professionals not only for Leningrad enterprises, but for whole the North-West region.

Today St. Petersburg State University of Service and Economics is modern, high-speed developing and the youngest State university of St. Petersburg. The number of specialties increased till 53 in 2008.

Since 1990 institute starts to prepare the specialists by full-time training. Many new specialties had been opened. In 1993 Leningrad branch of Moscow Technological Institute transformed into Technological Institute of Service. In 1999 it became independent as the St. Petersburg State Institute of Service and Economics (SISE). In 2002 by the order of the Ministry of education institute get the status of Academy (SPbSASE), and in 2005 also by the order of Ministry of education - status of University (SPbSUSE).

Now SPbSUSE is the only university in St. Petersburg, Leningrad region and all the areas of the North -West region of Russian Federation that prepares specialists with higher education in service, including domestic service, household facilities and equipment in wide spectrum of economical, technical, technological and social-culture specialties…

In accordance with Bologna Declaration, the University provides training in 3-level system of High Education bachelor's degree, Master's degree, Doctorate Degree.

Faculties 

The University is made up of 8 specialized faculties (departments):

- Service Enterprises Economy and Management

- Regional Economy and Management

- Tourism and International Economic Relations

- Social Science and Management of Social Processes

- Arts and Crafts and Design

- Motor Transport, Municipal Engineering and Household Facilities Service

- Trade and Restaurant Business

- Law

External links
 Official website

Universities in Saint Petersburg
Economics schools